Niels Tønder Lund (born 1749—died 1809) was a Danish zoologist.

References

1749 births
1809 deaths
Danish zoologists
Place of birth missing